Luton Town Football Club players of the season are voted for at the end of each season. There are a number of awards given at the end of season award ceremony:
 Luton Town Supporters' Trust (LTST) Player of the Season
 Players' Player of the Season
 Young Player of the Season
 Internet Player of the Season
 LTST Junior Members' Player of the Season
 Goal of the Season

Supporters' Trust Player of the Season

Young Player of the Season

References

Player of the Season
 Player of the Season
Association football player non-biographical articles
Association football player of the year awards by club in England